The 2006–07 Bobsleigh World Cup is a multi race tournament over a season for bobsleigh. The season started on 27 November 2006 and ended on 25 February 2007. The World Cup is organised by the FIBT who also run world cups and championships in skeleton.

Calendar

Men

Women

Men's overall results

Two-man

Four-man

Women's overall results

Two-woman

References

World Cup
World Cup
Bobsleigh World Cup